Aleh Charnyawski (born 25 November 1970) is a retired Belarusian professional footballer.

Career

Charnyawski started his career with Stroitel Starye Dorogi.

Honours
Dinamo Minsk
Belarusian Premier League champion: 1992, 1993–94, 1994–95, 1995, 1997
Belarusian Cup winner: 1992, 1993–94

References

External links
 
 

1970 births
Living people
Belarusian footballers
Belarus international footballers
FC Dinamo Minsk players
FC Shakhtyor Soligorsk players
FC Starye Dorogi players
FC Molodechno players
Association football midfielders
People from Izmail